The Legend of the Condor Heroes is a Hong Kong television series adapted from Louis Cha's novel of the same title. The series was first broadcast on CTV in Hong Kong in 1976.

Cast
 Note: Some of the characters' names are in Cantonese romanisation.

 Jason Pai as Kwok Ching
 Michelle Yim as Wong Yung
 Bruce Leung as Yeung Hong
 Mang Chau as Muk Nim-chi
 Michael Chan as Wong Yeuk-sze
 Yeung Chak-lam as Au-yeung Fung
 Chan Fei-lung as Hung Tsat-kung
 Chun Wong as Chow Pak-tung
 Chung Chi-keung as Yat-dang
 Cheng Lui as Yuen-ngan Hung-lit
 Ling Hon as Genghis Khan
 Lam Yan-yan as Wah-tsang
 Lau Kong as Au-yeung Hak
 Mak Tin-yan as Yau Chui-kei
 Tong Kam-tong as Ma Yuk
 Wu Yan-yan as Suen But-yee
 Kenneth Tsang as Kwok Shiu-tin
 Yu Yan as Lee Ping
 Paul Chun as Yeung Tit-sum
 Chen Sisi as Pau Si-yeuk
 Wong Man-wai as Ying-gu
 Wan Chuen as Or Chan-ngok
 Kam San as Chu Chung
 Kwong Wai-hung as Hon Po-kui
 Cheung Ching-yee as Hon Siu-ying
 Wong Kwok-leung as Kau Chin-yan / Kau Chin-cheung
 Hon Kwok-choi as Nam Hei-yan / Kau Chin-chi
 Law Lok-lam as Lo Yau-kiuk
 Cho Tat-wah as Luk Sing-fung
 Cheung Man-ting as Mui Chiu-fung
 Kan Yee-ching as Chan Yuen-fung
 Cheung Hung-cheung as Luk Koon-ying
 Chan Yuk-wai as Sor-ku
 Yeung See as Jebe
 Ko Hung as Sa Tung-tin
 Kiu Hung as How Tung-hoi
 Wan Fat as Ling-chi Seung-yan

External links

Television shows based on The Legend of the Condor Heroes
Television series set in the Southern Song
Television series set in the Jin dynasty (1115–1234)
Television series set in the Mongol Empire
Hong Kong wuxia television series
1976 Hong Kong television series debuts
1976 Hong Kong television series endings
Depictions of Genghis Khan on television
Television shows set in Hangzhou
Cantonese-language television shows